Francisco Manuel "Xisco" Pires Costa (born 25 January 1998) is an Andorran footballer who plays as a goalkeeper for Portuguese club SC Vianense and the Andorra national team.

Career
Pires made his international debut for Andorra on 7 October 2020 in a friendly match against Cape Verde, which finished as a 1–2 home loss.

Career statistics

International

References

External links
 
 
 

1998 births
Living people
People from Viana do Castelo
Andorran footballers
Andorra youth international footballers
Andorra under-21 international footballers
Andorra international footballers
Portuguese footballers
Portuguese emigrants to Andorra
Naturalised citizens of Andorra
Andorran people of Portuguese descent
Association football goalkeepers
FC Andorra players
FC Santa Coloma players
UE Engordany players
Primera Divisió players
Sportspeople from Viana do Castelo District